Maggie Goes on a Diet is a children's book by Paul Kramer about weight management in childhood aimed towards children aged 6–12. According to WorldCat, the book is held in 19 libraries as of May, 2015.

Plot summary
The book is about Maggie Magee, a 14-year-old girl who goes from being obese to thin. At the beginning of the book Maggie is bullied for being obese and she eats much bread and cheese in order to feel good. As time goes on she learns that if she is fat she will be bullied and decides to take action by losing weight. After eating healthier food such as fruit and oatmeal, and exercising more, she loses weight, her bullies become friends and she becomes very popular. She starts playing sports and at the end of the book she becomes a star soccer player.

Controversy 
The book has been criticized for its portrayal of weight loss in a book aimed towards young children, with parents and critics claiming that it could be potentially harmful to the very people that the book seeks to help. Film director Darryl Roberts states "We have to protect our children. Everyone's looking at today's youth as advertising opportunities, and it's screwing them up. A 6-year-old shouldn't be reading a book about someone who lost weight, became popular and life became better." Some consumers have chosen to boycott the book on Amazon, claiming that its message can be harmful.

Author Paul Kramer has defended his book, stating, "Maggie is accepting that kids are mean and kids can be mean and she has decided to do something about it, to take things in her own hands, try to change her own life, try to make herself healthy by exercising. She does want to look better. She does want to feel better and she does not want to be teased." Physician William Sears defended the work in a 2012 discussion, as he liked the book's moral of Maggie recognizing and taking responsibility for her obesity.

See also
My Beautiful Mommy
Childhood Obesity

References

External links
Aloha Publishers
Aloha Publishers' entry for Maggie Goes on a Diet
Aloha Publishers

American children's books
2011 children's books